The National Kidney Foundation Singapore (NKF) is a non-profit health organisation in Singapore. Its mission is to render services to kidney patients, encourage and promote renal research, as well as to carry out public education programs on kidney diseases. As of February 2016, NKF has 29 dialysis centres in Singapore.

History

Early years
NKF was founded in the early 1960s, after nephrologist Prof. Khoo Oon Teik witnessed many people suffering from kidney failure, including his own brother, Reverend Khoo Oon Eng. During that time, about 200 Singaporeans were dying each year from kidney failure. As a result, Prof. Khoo was determined to set up a National Kidney Foundation to help needy kidney patients. NKF was inaugurated on 7 April 1969, on World Health Day, by President Yusof Ishak.

Opening of satellite dialysis centres
In September 1982, NKF officially opened its first dialysis centre at the Kwong Wai Shiu Hospital. However, due to insufficient resources, it could only admit few patients. NKF started building dialysis centres in the vacant flats of HDB estates to lower costs and increase accessibility to dialysis for kidney patients. In 1987, the NKF's first satellite dialysis centre was established in Toa Payoh.

New headquarters
On 6 October 2001, a new building for NKF's headquarters was commissioned on Kim Keat Road. Singapore Buddhist Welfare Services, the late Tay Choon Hye, the Shaw Foundation, Singapore Pools and the Lee Foundation contributed a total of $21 million to the cost of building the NKF Centre.

The Children's Kidney Centre
In 2002, the Shaw Foundation donated $4 million to open a Children's Kidney Centre at the National University Hospital to support children with kidney diseases.

Scandal and aftermath

In July 2005, a new board and management team was formed for a leaner, cost-effective NKF, after former CEO, T.T Durai, and directors stepped down due to breach of fiduciary duties, among others.

Following a recovery from the scandal, Chairman Gerard Ee, handed over the reins in 2012 to Koh Poh Tiong. In 2013, CEO Eunice Tay retired, and Edmund Kwok took over.

On 16 November 2016, the NKF board held a press conference announcing that Edmund Kwok was removed from his position as CEO, due to a police case involving Kwok and a NKF male employee.

Education and prevention

Aside from providing dialysis treatment, NKF also focuses on kidney disease education and prevention, against as diabetes and hypertension, which are leading causes of kidney failure.

The Schools Outreach Programme teaches children about kidney functions, kidney failure, and how kidney patients cope with this chronic condition. The program includes visits to the Kidney Discovery Centre at NKF's headquarters; school assembly talks, and health booths at schools; and the Kidney Health Education Bus, which has health screening stations.

The Little Champs and Young Champs Programmes aim to strengthen students’ leadership abilities and inspire them to make a difference to the community and in the lives of kidney patients.

‘Healthy Mondays’ is a programme for adults. Introduced to organisations and corporations, it consists of health talks, health screenings and exercises to nurture healthy lifestyles for employees.

NKF also works with local media, healthcare and social agencies, grass-roots organisations, and institutions to disseminate health messages.

Providing peritoneal dialysis
NKF also promotes Peritoneal Dialysis (PD) allowing kidney patients to have more flexibility and control of their lifestyle, by undergoing treatment at home. To encourage PD and build the confidence of patients undergoing this treatment, the NKF has a Comprehensive PD Community Support Programme where trained and experienced PD nurses work closely with the hospitals to support PD patients at home to help them start and stay well on PD.

Notable programmes

Besides providing dialysis, NKF has instituted patient welfare programs, helping patients cope with illness, aiding them with re-integrating into society, as well as supporting their families.

Patient Employment Rehabilitation Programme
In November 2015, NKF launched the Patient Employment Rehabilitation Programme, to match jobless patients with suitable jobs, and hire some patients as staff.

Kidney Live Donor Support Programme
In 2009, the Kidney Live Donor Support Programme was launched to provide financial assistance for needy live donors to ensure that costs were not an obstacle for the donor's long-term medical follow-up.

Partnerships 

NKF partners with the Ministry of Health, other healthcare providers and the community, to increase awareness of kidney disease and prevention, promote kidney transplantation, and encourage home dialysis and to improve dialysis care.

References

External links
Official website

Medical and health organisations based in Singapore
Singaporean voluntary welfare organisations
Foundations based in Singapore
Medical and health foundations
Organizations established in 1969
1969 establishments in Singapore